The Age of Hell is the sixth studio album by American heavy metal band Chimaira. The album was released on August 16, 2011. The album sold more than 7,000 copies in the United States in its first week of release to debut at position No. 54 on the Billboard 200 chart. In an interview, the band stated they have filmed a music video. On August 10, 2011, the official video for "Year of the Snake" was released. The DVD that was released through a Hot Topic edition featured a 50-minute interview with the new line up, no music videos were featured.

In the United Kingdom, the full album was given away as a free CD in the September 2011 issue of Metal Hammer magazine.

Critical reception
In a review for AllMusic, critic reviewer Dave Donnelly wrote: "Drummer Andols Herrick, keyboardist Chris Spicuzza, and bassist Jim LaMarca left the Ohio metal band in the preceding months, leaving vocalist Mark Hunter to cover keyboards and guitarist Rob Arnold to take over bass duties while producer Ben Schigel deputized on drums. What's remarkable is how little an effect the stated departures had on the sound of the album. It's a very smooth and seamless transition from 2009's The Infection - so much so that it's not immediately obvious that anything has changed." Rick Bakker of Metal Arcade called the album "a definite return to form for Chimaira. It's the sound of a band that has regained its confidence, learned from their mistakes and secured its foothold in the metal landscape."

Track listing

Personnel

Chimaira

 Mark Hunter – vocals, keyboards, samples
 Rob Arnold – guitars, bass
 Ben Schigel – drums

Additional musicians
 Tony Gammalo – bass guitar on "Beyond the Grave"
 Emil Werstler – additional guitar solo on "Samsara", additional keyboards and samples
 Phil Bozeman – additional vocals on "Born in Blood"
 Patrick Finegan, Lauren Dupont, Vincent DiFranco – additional keyboards and samples
 Kalam Muttalib – saxophone on "Clockwork", additional keyboards and samples
 Austin D'amond – drums (16)
 Emil Werstler – guitar (16)
 Sean Z – keyboards (16)

Production
 Ben Schigel – producer
 Mark Hunter – producer
 Tony Gammalo – additional production
 Rob Arnold – additional production 
 Zeuss  – mixing, mastering at Planet Z Studios
 Garrett Zunt – artwork, design 
 Todd Bell – additional artwork, art direction

Charts

References

2011 albums
Chimaira albums
E1 Music albums